
Abari is a village in Racha-Lechkhumi and Kvemo Svaneti region, Georgia. It is part of the Likheti commune, Ambrolauri municipality, with the population of 122, mostly (99.2%) ethnic Georgians, as of the 2014 census.

Abari is located on the right bank of the Lukhuni river, a right tributary of the Rioni, on the southern foothills of the Lechkhumi Range, 17 km. northeast of the town of Ambrolauri.

The population of Abari is dominated by two surnames: Lobzhanidze and Japaridze. According to local tradition, the village was founded by a man surnamed Lobzhanidze from the Ghebi in the northernmost part of Racha in the 18th century. The Japaridze descend from a priest sent to Abari in the 19th century. Since the Soviet period, the families in Abari have used rural-urban migration to access the different resources provided by the village and the city.

References

Sources
 

Populated places in Ambrolauri Municipality